Althea was launched at Calcutta in 1801. She made one voyage to Britain for the British East India Company. The French captured her in the Indian Ocean in 1804 and then kept her at Île de France where she served as a prison ship. When the British captured Île de France in 1810 they recovered Althea. (However, it is probable that they recovered her in between, and lost her again.) She then resumed her mercantile career until she wrecked in 1812.

Career
Captain Arundel Roberts sailed Althea from Calcutta on 24 January 1802, bound for London. She passed Saugor on 15 April and reached Saint Helena on 24 July. Althea arrived at Deptford on 15 October.

Althea was admitted to the Registry of Great Britain on 25 November 1802.

Capture (1804) and recapture (1810)
On 6 April 1804 Althea, which was coming from Bengal, was near Ceylon when she parted from her convoy in a gale. On 17 April the French frigates  and  captured Althea in the Indian Ocean. Captain Miller engaged Atalante, which came up first, but when Belle Poule came up on his other side he decided to strike. One problem Miller faced was that the frigates were firing their long 18-pounder guns from a range that Altheas carronades could not reach. Althea reached Port Napoleon, Île de France, on 8 May. She and her cargo were immediately condemned in prize.

Althea had been insured for £400,000. Althea was sailing under charter to the EIC, which valued the cargo it lost at £6,698. 

In a process that is currently obscure, the British appear to have recovered Althea. In March 1806, Captain William Richardson, in Althea, took on water at Pulo Timoan, and also took a number of navigational bearings. . On 20 July as Althea was returning to Bengal from China, she was pushed towards the Matelotas. In August she was at Salayer Island. In April 1807, as Althea was sailing from Bencoolen to Bengal, the Portuguese cook killed a "mussulman boy, of about five or six years of age, by running an iron instrument" up the boy's rectum. The court acquitted the cook of murder, but convicted him of manslaughter. Between August and October 1807, privateers and French naval vessels from Mauritius captured Althea, Elizabeth, Trafalgar, Mangles, Susanna, Caroline, Succedany, Eliza, Udny, Highland Chief, Resource, Louisa, and Mersosa. The prizes were worth about 3 million rupees. Lloyd's List reported on 16 April 1808 that the country ships Eliza, Resources, Gilwell, Loi'a, and Althea had been taken in the Bay of Bengal.

This would suggest that it was Sémillante, rather than a privateer, that captured Althea and Richardson. Althea was then laid up at Mauritius as a prison ship.

On 3 December 1810 the British captured Île de France. Among the vessels the Royal Navy found at Port Napoleon was "L'Althea, of 1000 Tons".

Fate
Althea was lost upon Fultah Point, on the Hooghli River, in July 1812.

Notes, citations, and references
Notes

Citations

References
 

House of Commons, Parliament, Great Britain (1814), Minutes of the Evidence Taken Before the Select Committee on Petitions Relating to East-India-Built Shipping. (H.M. Stationery Office)
 
Reports from the Select Committee of the House of Commons appointed to enquire into the present state of the affairs of the East India Company, together with the minutes of evidence, an appendix of documents, and a general index,  (1830), Vol. 2, p.977.

1801 ships
British ships built in India
Ships of the British East India Company
Merchant ships of the United Kingdom
Age of Sail merchant ships
Maritime incidents in 1812
Captured ships